is a district located in Okayama Prefecture, Japan.

As of 2003, the district has an estimated population of 55,658 and a density of 621.67 persons per km2. The total area is 89.53 km2.

Towns and villages
Satoshō

Merger
On August 1, 2005 the town of Funao became part of the city of Kurashiki.
On March 21, 2006 the towns of Kamogata, Konkō and Yorishima merged to form the city of Asakuchi.

Therefore, this leaves Satoshō the only member of a "rump" Asakuchi-Gun.

Districts in Okayama Prefecture